Covalent may refer to:

Covalent bond, a type of chemical bond
Covalent radius, half the distance between two covalently bonded atoms
Covalent modulation, the alteration of protein structure by covalent bonding